Although Frédéric Chopin is best known for his works for piano solo, among his extant output are 19 songs for voice and piano, set to Polish texts.

Background
Chopin wrote these songs at various times, from perhaps as early as 1827 when he was 17, to 1847, two years before his death.  Only two of them were published in his lifetime (Życzenie and Wojak were published in Kyiv in 1837 and 1839 respectively).

In 1857 the 17 then known songs were collected for publication by Julian Fontana as Op. 74, but they were not arranged in chronological order of composition within that opus. Due to censorship restrictions, he was only able to publish 16 of them initially.  These appeared in Warsaw as Zbiór śpiewów polskich Fryderyka Chopina (A Collection of Polish Songs by Frédéric Chopin), published by Gebethner & Wolff; and in Berlin as 16 Polnische Lieder, published by A M Schlesinger.  The 17th song, Śpiew z mogiłki (Hymn from the Tomb) was published separately in Berlin with a French title, Chant du tombeau.

A further two songs were published in 1910.  Some references now include all 19 published songs in Op. 74.

Chopin is known to have written a number of other songs that are now lost.  Some extant songs have been attributed to Chopin but are now considered spurious or doubtful.

Texts
All but one of the texts of the Chopin songs were original poems by his Polish contemporaries, with most of whom he was personally acquainted.  The sole exception is Piosnka litewska (A Lithuanian Song), which was set to a Polish translation by Ludwik Osiński of a Lithuanian song.

Ten of them are by a friend of Chopin’s family, Stefan Witwicki, from his Piosnki Sielskie (Idylls, 1830).  (Chopin also dedicated his Mazurkas, Op. 41, to Witwicki.)  Three were by Józef Bohdan Zaleski.  Two were by  a friend of Chopin’s named Adam Mickiewicz.  Wincenty Pol's revolutionary Songs of Janusz (1836) inspired Chopin to write up to a dozen songs, but only one survives. Zygmunt Krasiński, the lover of Delfina Potocka, was another poet who inspired Chopin to write a song.

The songs have been translated into over a dozen languages.  Various English titles have been applied to some of the songs.

Recordings
Those who have recorded the 17 songs of Op. 74, or all 19 known songs, include:
 Elisabeth Söderström with Vladimir Ashkenazy
 Leyla Gencer with Nikita Magaloff
 Stefania Toczyska with Janusz Olejniczak
 Teresa Żylis-Gara with Halina Czerny-Stefańska
 Eugenia Zareska with Giorgio Favaretto
 Stefania Woytowicz and Andrzej Bachleda with Wanda Klimowicz
 Françoise Ogéas with Eva Osinska
 Maria Kurenko with Robert Hufstader
 Urszula Kryger with Charles Spencer.
 H Januszewska with M Drewnowski
 Joanna Kozłowska with Waldemar Malicki, CDAccord ACD051 (1999)
 Elżbieta Szmytka with Malcolm Martineau (1999)
 Ewa Podleś with Garrick Ohlsson
 Aleksandra Kurzak, soprano, and Mariusz Kwiecień, baritone, accompanied by Nelson Goerner (all 19 songs, recorded in Warsaw in 2009 and issued by the Fryderyk Chopin Institute)
 Olga Pasichnyk with Natalya Pasichnyk (2009)
 Mario Hacquard, baritone and Anna Zassimova, piano (French version by Victor Wilder - Recorded in Karlsruhe with a piano by Sebastien Erard - 2017)
 Chopin Lieder Op. 74, produced by Elegia Classics 2018 with Dominika Zamara sopran and Franco Moro piano

Other singers have recorded selected songs.

Arrangements
Chopin himself arranged the piano part of Wiosna as a piece for piano alone, Andantino in G minor, B. 117.  There exist five manuscript versions of this arrangement, dated between April 1838 and 1 September 1848.

Between 1847 and 1860, Chopin's friend Franz Liszt arranged six of the Op. 74 songs as piano transcriptions under the title Six Chants polonais, S.480, a set which has long been a concert and recording favourite.  The six are:

 1. Mädchens Wunsch (No. 1: Życzenie – The Wish)
 2. Frühling (No. 2: Wiosna – Spring)
 3. Das Ringlein (No. 14: Pierścień – The Ring), which leads without a break into ...
 4. Bacchanal (No. 4: Hulanka – Merrymaking)
 5. Meine Freuden (No. 12: Moja pieszczotka – My Darling)
 6. Heimkehr (No. 15: Narzeczony – The Bridegroom).

In this arrangement, Das Ringlein leads without a break into Bacchanal, and towards the end of the latter song, immediately before the coda, Liszt includes a short 6-bar reprise of the earlier song.

List of Polish songs by Chopin

References

External links

The Spirit of Poland in Jim Samson: The Music of Chopin, pp 100, Oxford University Press 1985

Art songs
Chopin
Compositions by Frédéric Chopin published posthumously